Gumersindo Magaña Negrete (5 December 1939 – 16 April 2013) was a Mexican politician from  Uruapan, Michoacán. He was member of the right-wing and now dissolved Mexican Democratic Party (PDM), who represented his party in the 1988 presidential election. In this election, he faced Carlos Salinas, Cuauhtémoc Cárdenas, Rosario Ibarra and Manuel Clouthier.

In spite of the hopes expressed by Magaña during the electoral campaign, his party managed to obtain only 199,484 or 1.04% of the votes, a very distant fourth place, causing the party to lose its registry, which would return to recover more three times, until he definitively lost it in the mid-term federal elections of 1997.

Magaña retired from political life in 1988 and was not a registered member of any party. He died in 2013 in San Luis Potosí City.

References

1939 births
2013 deaths
People from Uruapan
Politicians from Michoacán
Candidates in the 1988 Mexican presidential election
Mexican Democratic Party politicians